Kataysk is a town and the administrative center of Kataysky District in Kurgan Oblast, Russia, located on the Iset River  northwest of Kurgan, the administrative center of the oblast. Population:

History
It was founded in 1655 by Imperial Russia as Kataysky. It was granted town status in 1944.

Administrative and municipal status
Within the framework of administrative divisions, Kataysk serves as the administrative center of Kataysky District. As an administrative division, it is incorporated within Kataysky District as Kataysk Town Under District Jurisdiction. As a municipal division, Kataysk Town Under District Jurisdiction is incorporated within Kataysky Municipal District as Kataysk Urban Settlement.

Notable people associated with the city
Maria Lagunova, World War II Soviet woman tank driver, honorary citizen of the city

References

Notes

Sources

External links

Official website of Kataysk 
Kataysk Business Directory 

Cities and towns in Kurgan Oblast